Tara Spires-Jones is professor of neurodegeneration and deputy director of the Centre for Discovery Brain Sciences at the University of Edinburgh. She is also programme lead of the UK Dementia Research Institute.

Education and career 
Spires-Jones studied as an undergraduate at the University of Texas at Austin, where she graduated as a Bachelor of Science in biochemistry and a Bachelor of Arts in French in 1999.  She was awarded a British Marshall Scholarship, which enabled her to undertake a D.Phil. in environmental influences on synapse development and degeneration with Sir Colin Blakemore at the University of Oxford.  After completing her D.Phil. in 2004, Spires-Jones worked as a postdoctoral research fellow neurology at Massachusetts General Hospital and Harvard Medical School, where she undertook research on synaptic degeneration and Alzheimer's disease pathogenesis. Following her fellowship she remained at Massachusetts General Hospital and Harvard Medical School as an instructor from 2006 to 2011 and assistant professor from 2011 to 2013. In 2013 Spires-Jones moved to Scotland to join the University of Edinburgh as reader and Chancellor's Fellow.  She was awarded a personal chair of neurodegeneration at the university in 2017.

Spires-Jones is a Federation of European Neuroscience Societies (FENS)-KAVLI Network of Excellence scholar, chair of the Alzheimer's Research UK Grant Review Board and a member of the Scottish Government's Scottish Science Advisory Council.

She regularly engages in science communication, outreach and engagement, and is a member of the Science Media Centre, advising journalists on science reporting, and commenting on new science stories.

Research 
Spires-Jones' research focuses on synaptic changes and dementia, specifically the degeneration of synapse connections between neuronal braincells in Alzheimer's disease.  Using array tomography and multiphoton imaging to examine both diseased and healthy brain tissue, Spires-Jones' research has shown that the amyloid beta and tau proteins that cause neuropathological lesions in Alzheimer's disease, contribute to synapse loss and that reducing the level of these proteins prevents synaptic degeneration. Preventing the spread of tau proteins may enable new synapse connections to be formed.

Her research has also shown how alpha-synuclein protein builds up in neurons that connect cells in Dementia with Lewy Bodies, suggesting that these connections enable the protein to jump between cells, spreading damage through the brain and causing symptoms of dementia.

References

Year of birth missing (living people)
Living people
Academics of the University of Edinburgh
American neuroscientists
Alzheimer's disease researchers
University of Texas at Austin alumni
Alumni of the University of Oxford
American women neuroscientists
American women academics
21st-century American women